Marcel Auguste Denise (February 3, 1906 – 20 July 1990) was the head of state of Ivory Coast before the independency after Ernest De Nattes, a colonial administrator who was stationed in Côte d'Ivoire.
He was the "President of the provisional government" of Côte d'Ivoire during the colonial and autonomous period. An Ivorian statesman with West Indian origin (Martinique).

After the referendum of 1958 organized in the French colonies of Africa during which the Ivory Coast votes for the “yesN 1” which grants the former colonies the status of “republics within the French community”, Auguste Denise is appointed Prime Minister with Jean-Baptiste Mockey as Minister of the Interior and Ernest Boka as Minister of Education.

He was replaced in this post in 1959 by Félix Houphouët-Boigny who, on this occasion, left his post as minister of the French government and was the first ivoirian President of the National Assembly. After him, was president of the national assemble Victor Capri Djédjé

Its name was given to the Auguste-Denise stadium located in the city of San-Pédro, in the west of the country.

References 

1906 births
1990 deaths
People of French West Africa
Heads of government of Ivory Coast